Shariatpur-3 is a constituency represented in the Jatiya Sangsad (National Parliament) of Bangladesh since 2012 by Nahim Razzaq of the Awami League.

Boundaries 
The constituency encompasses Damudya and Gosairhat upazilas and the Bhedarganj Thana portion of Bhedarganj Upazila, all in Shariatpur District. Bhedarganj Thana consists of Bhedarganj Municipality and Chhaygaon, Mahisar, Naryanpur, and Rambhadrapur Union Parishads.

History 
The constituency was created in 1984 from the Faridpur-16 constituency when the former Faridpur District was split into five districts: Rajbari, Faridpur, Gopalganj, Madaripur, and Shariatpur.

Ahead of the 2008 general election, the Election Commission redrew constituency boundaries to reflect population changes revealed by the 2001 Bangladesh census. The 2008 redistricting altered the boundaries of the constituency.

Members of Parliament

Elections

Elections in the 2010s 
Nahim Razzaq was re-elected unopposed in the 2014 general election after opposition parties withdrew their candidacies in a boycott of the election.

Abdur Razzaq died in December 2011. Nahim Razzaq, his son, was elected unopposed in February 2012 after the Election Commission disqualified the only other candidate in the by-election scheduled for March 2012.

Elections in the 2000s

Elections in the 1990s

References

External links
 

Parliamentary constituencies in Bangladesh
Shariatpur District